Nicholas Edward Choi is a Hong Kong foil fencer.

Career
Choi took up fencing in 2002 while he was in primary school. He thought the sport was cool because of the lights going off at each hit. His younger sister, Natasha Erica, followed his example. When she was selected into the Hong Kong Sports Institute junior fencing team, his pride was piqued and he resolved to train harder until he was selected in his turn.

In 2010 he was the second-placed Asian at the Cadet World Championships in Baiku, qualifying to the 2010 Summer Youth Olympics. He was defeated in the table of 16 by Denmark's Alexander Tsoronis and finished 9th. He was then drafted into the Hong Kong's senior fencing team and began to study at the Institute of Vocational Education, Chai Wan. At the 2011 Asian Championships he reached the quarter-finals after seeing off Olympic silver medallist Yuki Ota.

At the age of 19, Choi qualified to the 2012 Summer Olympics as the second-ranked Asian, becoming the youngest fencer to represent Hong Kong at the Olympics. Despite losing in the first round to Romania's Radu Dărăban, he received a “Hong Kong Potential Sports Star Award” for his achievement.

In 2018, Choi won two silver medals in the men's foil individual and team event at the Asian Games in Jakarta, Indonesia, which is the best ever result of Hong Kong fencers. He retired shortly after the competition, but announced his return in April 2021, targeting for Paris Olympics.

Personal life
Choi is a mixed-race child of Chinese, Korean and Filipino descent (father is Chinese-Korean mixed, mother is Filipino). His father is the leader of the Hong Kong fencing team; his elder sister serves as the head of English at a Direct Subsidy Scheme secondary school on Lantau Island; and his younger twin sister Natasha Choi was also a fencing player. Choi studied at Lam Tai Fai College and took the Hong Kong Certificate of Education Examination (HKCEE) in 2010. He was a candidate for the last cohort of the HKCEE. He is a friend of Jackson Wang, a former member of the Hong Kong Fencing Team and the Korean group Got7.

References

External links
 Profile at the Hong Kong Fencing Federation

1993 births
Living people
Hong Kong male foil fencers
Hong Kong people of Korean descent
Hong Kong people of Filipino descent
Fencers at the 2012 Summer Olympics
Fencers at the 2010 Summer Youth Olympics
Olympic fencers of Hong Kong
Fencers at the 2014 Asian Games
Fencers at the 2018 Asian Games
Asian Games silver medalists for Hong Kong
Asian Games bronze medalists for Hong Kong
Asian Games medalists in fencing
Medalists at the 2014 Asian Games
Medalists at the 2018 Asian Games
21st-century Hong Kong people